Siera Santos (born June 10, 1988) is an American sportscaster. She is a MLB Network personality who was hired to be one of the hosts of Quick Pitch after Heidi Watney left. Santos has also been a fill-in host for Off Base, and is also an NHL Network personality who occasionally hosts On the Fly. In March 2023 Santos was named the host of Intentional Talk with Kevin Millar and Ryan Dempster.

Early life and education
She grew up in Phoenix, Arizona and graduated from Arizona State University in Tempe, Arizona with honors majoring in broadcast journalism.

Career
Santos got her start in Colorado Springs, Colorado at KOAA-TV then went KWTV in Oklahoma City, Oklahoma, and then KCBS-TV in Los Angeles, California. Santos worked in Chicago, Illinois for four and a half years from 2015-2020 first at NBC Sports Chicago and then for WFLD before going back home to Phoenix working at KSAZ-TV. While at NBC Sports Chicago, she served as the beat reporter for the Chicago White Sox, appearing on pregame, in-game and postgame during White Sox broadcasts. After the departures of Watney and Alexa Datt in 2022, Santos was one of the hires by the MLB Network.

Personal life
Santos is a fan of the Arizona teams.

References

External links

Living people
American television reporters and correspondents
Arizona State University alumni
American sports journalists
Women sports journalists
American women television journalists
21st-century American women
1988 births